Everett School, also known as St. Joseph Christian School, is a historic school building located at St. Joseph, Missouri.  It was built in 1909, and is a two-story, "E"-plan, Colonial Revival style brick building on a raised basement.  It features a crenellated parapet and central bay topped by a large projecting metal arch with prominent keystone. Also on the property are the contributing gymnasium and power plant.

It was listed on the National Register of Historic Places in 2005.

References

School buildings on the National Register of Historic Places in Missouri
Colonial Revival architecture in Missouri
School buildings completed in 1909
Buildings and structures in St. Joseph, Missouri
National Register of Historic Places in Buchanan County, Missouri
1909 establishments in Missouri